La Ceja (Spanish: "The Eyebrow") may refer to:

 La Ceja, Antioquia, a town and municipality in Antioquia, Colombia
 La ceja (Spain), a landform of the Province of Albacete, Spain

See also 
 Ceja (disambiguation)